This is a disambiguation page. Ruhleben may refer to

Ruhleben-Spandau - a district in Berlin, Germany
Ruhleben (Berlin U-Bahn) - a Berlin underground station
Ruhleben internment camp - a World War I detention camp for enemy civilians
Ruhleben Barracks - a German naval barracks in Plön, Holstein